T45, T.45 or T-45 may refer to:

Vehicles 
 Cooper T45, a racecar
 McDonnell Douglas T-45 Goshawk, an aircraft carrier-capable trainer aircraft
 SJ T45, a 1971 a Swedish diesel-electric locomotive
 Slingsby T.45 Swallow, a British glider
 Type 45 destroyer, an air defence destroyer developed for the Royal Navy
 T45 Roadtrain, a 1988 Leyland Motors tractor truck

Other uses 
 T45 (classification), a disabled sports handicap class for arm amputees
 T45, a size of Torx screw head
 T.45 ITU standard for run-length color encoding